Reece Alan Young (born 15 September 1979) in Auckland is a New Zealand Test cricketer who played for the Auckland Aces and Canterbury Wizards. He is the 250th Test cap for New Zealand.

Domestic career
Young made his debut as a keeper/batsman for the Auckland Aces in the 1998/99 season. His career spanned 15 seasons and included playing for the Canterbury Wizards from 2010-2012 from where he was selected to represent NZ. 
Young suffered a near career ending ankle injury playing for Auckland in late 2007 as a result of a collision when taking a catch with team mate Martin Guptill. His injury kept him out of all cricket for 9 months with on going rehab. Young progressed well and once deemed fit returned to professional cricket being selected in late 2008 for the New Zealand 'A' tour of Australia and India. On 21 January 2009, Young scored his maiden one-day century (119) for Auckland against Northern Districts. This was a productive season for Young, also becoming Aucklands Batsman of the season with the most runs and an average of over 50. 2009 also saw him tour Sri Lanka with the Blackcaps. 

Before Young got called up for New Zealand, he carried out stints as a professional in the UK. Young has played all over the UK with his last stint being Heyside Cricket Club, Oldham, Greater Manchester where he showcased his skills with the bat and also a superb keeper. An asset for the club both on the field and off it.

International career
On 21 August 2009 Young was called into the New Zealand Cricket team to keep wicket in a test match against Sri Lanka at Galle when both test keeper Brendan McCullum and backup Jesse Ryder were struck down with a stomach bug.

Following that, Young picked up his first Test Cap for New Zealand in January 2011 vs Pakistan on his 100th first class match. He scored his maiden test 50 in only his second test against the same opposition and was also part of the Blackcap’s XI who famously beat Australia at Hobart in 2011, the first time a NZ Test team had won on Australian soil since 1985 (26 years).

Beyond cricket
Young has now undertaken new business opportunities in Auckland beginning with Players Sports NZ, then moving onto NZ Lifestyle brand Triumph & Disaster. 
Young is now involved with independent construction equipment hire company, NJC Equipment Hire as the General Manager.

See also
 List of Auckland representative cricketers

References

External links
 

1979 births
Living people
New Zealand cricketers
New Zealand Test cricketers
Auckland cricketers
Canterbury cricketers
Wicket-keepers